Friederike Moltmann is a linguist and philosopher. She has done pioneering work at the intersection of philosophy and linguistics, especially on the interface between metaphysics and natural language semantics, but also on the interface between philosophy of mind and mathematics. She is an important proponent of natural language ontology. She is currently Research Director at the French National Centre for Scientific Research (CNRS) in Paris.

Biography 
Moltmann studied linguistics, philosophy and mathematics in Berlin and Munich. Her PhD, awarded in 1992, was carried out at Massachusetts Institute of Technology under the supervision of Noam Chomsky. Following this, she taught at various universities in the US and the UK. In 2006 she was appointed Research Director at CNRS. Since 2013 she has been a visiting researcher at New York University, and in 2016 she was Visiting Professor at the University of Padua.

Moltmann is founder of the annual Semantics and Philosophy in Europe colloquium, and founder member of the International Center for Formal Ontology in Warsaw.

Awards and honours 
In 2007 she received a Chair of Excellence from the French National Research Agency on the topic of "Ontological Structure and Semantic Structure".

Work 
Her core research area is the relation between linguistics and ontology as well as the connection between linguistics and philosophy of mind, philosophy of language, and mathematics. Her research on natural language ontology deals with the semantics of mass nouns, plurals, and part-whole expressions, events and event structure, reference to abstract objects, and tropes (particularized properties) in natural language, the semantics of numerals, and the ontology that forms the basis of the semantics of attitude reports and modal sentences.

Her research integrates philosophy and linguistics in a novel way, often by reviving older concepts or terms from the history of philosophy that seem to be reflected in natural language. For instance, in Parts and Wholes In Semantics (Oxford University Press, 1997) she uses the Aristotelian concept of form and the concept of integrated whole from Gestalt theory to analyse the semantics of plural and mass nouns and expressions referring to parts. In Abstract Objects and the Semantics of Natural Language (Oxford University Press, 2013) she returns to the Aristotelian/medieval category of trope and revives Kazimierz Twardowski's distinction between actions and products.

In other research she uses concepts from contemporary philosophy in the analysis of natural language semantics, such as plural reference, simulation, and truthmaking. Her research also deals with important philosophical concepts from the perspective of natural language: truth, existence, deontic modality, nonexistent objects, and relative truth.

Significant influences on her work include Noam Chomsky and Kit Fine.

Books 
 Abstract Objects and the Semantics of Natural Language. Oxford University Press, New York, 2013. 
 Parts and Wholes in Semantics. Oxford University Press, New York, 1997. Paperback, 2003. 
 Individuation und Lokalität. Studien zur Ereignis- und Nominalphrasensemantik. (Individuation and locality: Studies on the semantics of event and nominal phrases.) Fink Verlag, Munich 1992.

Edited volumes 
 Unity and Plurality. Logic, Philosophy, and Semantics. Edited with Massimiliano Carrara and Alexandra Arapinis, Oxford University Press, Oxford, 2016. 
 Act-Based Conceptions of Propositional Content. Historical and Contemporary Perspectives. Edited with Mark Textor, Oxford University Press, New York, 2017.

Encyclopaedia entries 
 'Natural Language Ontology'. Oxford Research Encyclopedia of Linguistics. Oxford University Press, New York, April 2017.
 'Natural Language and its Ontology'. In A. Goldman / B. McLaughlin (eds): Metaphysics and Cognitive Science, Oxford UP, 2019, .
 'Natural Language Ontology'. In R. Bliss/J. Miller (eds.): Routledge Handbook of Metametaphyics, London, 2020

Links 
 Website of Friederike Moltmann
 Interview with 3:AM Magazine
 Page on Academia.edu
 PhilPapers profile

References 

Linguists from Germany
20th-century German philosophers
21st-century German philosophers
German women philosophers
Research directors of the French National Centre for Scientific Research
Living people
Year of birth missing (living people)
20th-century German women
21st-century German women
Women linguists
Massachusetts Institute of Technology alumni